Oyak Renault is a professional basketball club based in Bursa, Turkey that plays in the Turkish Basketball League (TBL). Their home arena is the Bursa Atatürk Sport Hall. The club has played in this league between 1982–1984, 1992–2000, 2001–2004 and since 2006. The club is sponsored by the Oyak-Renault plant.

Notable players

 Mehmet Okur
 Olu Famutimi
 James Mays
 Mithat Demirel
 Lorenzo Charles
 Ben Handlogten
 Josh Heytvelt
 Mike Rose
 Greg Stiemsma
 Marc Salyers

References

External links
Official website 
TBLStat.net Profile

 
Basketball teams in Turkey
Basketball teams established in 1974
Turkish Basketball Super League teams
Sport in Bursa